Agents of Fortune is the fourth studio album by American hard rock band Blue Öyster Cult, released by Columbia Records on May 21, 1976.

The Platinum-selling album peaked at No. 29 on the U.S. Billboard chart, while the cryptic single "(Don't Fear) The Reaper" peaked at No. 12 on the Billboard Hot 100 singles chart, making it BÖC's biggest hit. The band became a bigger concert attraction after the release of the album, in part due to extensive airplay of "(Don't Fear) The Reaper", to this day a staple of rock-station playlists.

Additionally, this is the only album in the group's discography to not include any songs written by Eric Bloom and to have at least one lead vocal performance by each original band member. However, Bloom's name was added to the authorship credits for "E.T.I. (Extra Terrestrial Intelligence)" on the live CD 2020: Agents of Fortune Live 2016.

Critical reception

Rolling Stone wrote that "Agents of Fortune is a startlingly excellent album — startling because one does not expect Blue Oyster Cult to sound like this: loud but calm, manic but confident, melodic but rocking."

Cash Box said of the single "This Ain't the Summer of Love" that "growling guitars churn out this realistic message with brief and pointed expression" and that "a mood of evil created in a humorous fashion."

Track listing

Personnel 
 Band members
 Eric Bloom – guitar, vocals, keyboards, percussion
 Donald "Buck Dharma" Roeser – lead guitar, vocals
 Allen Lanier – keyboards, rhythm guitar, bass on "Morning Final", vocals
 Joe Bouchard – bass, piano on "Morning Final", vocals
 Albert Bouchard – drums, percussion, acoustic guitar, vocals 

 Additional musicians
 Patti Smith – vocals on "The Revenge of Vera Gemini"
 Randy Brecker – horns
 Michael Brecker – horns
 David Lucas – vocals, keyboards, percussion

 The cowbell on "(Don't Fear) The Reaper" may have been played by Albert Bouchard, David Lucas, or Eric Bloom.

 Production
 David Lucas , Murray Krugman, Sandy Pearlman – producers
 Shelly Yakus, Andy Abrams – engineers
 Tony Stevens – mastering
 John Berg, Andy Engel – design
 Lynn Curlee – paintings

Charts

Album

Singles
(Don't Fear) The Reaper

Certifications

Accolades

References

Blue Öyster Cult albums
1976 albums
Columbia Records albums
Albums produced by Murray Krugman
Albums produced by Sandy Pearlman